Bitton is a village and civil parish of South Gloucestershire in  England, to the east of the Greater Bristol area on the River Boyd.

It is in South Gloucestershire.  The parish of Bitton has a population of 9,307, and apart from the village itself, includes Swineford, Upton Cheyney, Beach, Oldland Common, North Common and part of Willsbridge.

Governance
An electoral ward with the same name exists. This ward does not cover as much of the outskirts of Bristol as the parish. The total population of the ward taken at the 2011 census is 3,509.

Transport
The A431 road runs through the village. Beyond Bitton the road routes north-west to Willsbridge and south-east to Kelston.
The heritage Avon Valley Railway is based at Bitton railway station. The National Cycle Network Bristol and Bath Railway Path runs alongside the railway. Bus Routes 19, 37, 441, 443 and 684 run down the A431 and go towards Bath and bristol City Centres and suburbs.

Sport
Bitton A.F.C. are the local football team and Bitton CC are the local cricket team. They both play at the Recreation Ground, immediately south of the A431, just west of the village.

Bitton Road Runners is a running club based in the east of Bristol which caters for all running abilities. Founded in 1986 to help people better enjoy the sport of running, it is a thriving club with over 300 members in both junior and senior sections.

Notable people
H. T. Ellacombe, the inventor of the Ellacombe apparatus used for bell-ringing, was curate from 1817 to 1835, and vicar from 1835 to 1850. His son H. N. Ellacombe, vicar from 1850 to 1916,  was active in the 1860s in the distribution of the robust, large, early-flowering snowdrop Galanthus nivalis 'Atkinsii' "that grew at the south wall in his garden in Bitton." Bitton is the birthplace of author Dick King Smith and actress Richenda Carey, and was home to television presenter Noel Edmonds.
Also Harold Crofton Sleigh the founder of H.C.Sleigh Shipping Company & Golden Fleece Petroleum Company, Melbourne, Australia,  lived in Belmont House with his parents, in 1881.

Bibliography
Ellacombe, Henry Thomas History of the Manor of Bitton, 1869.

Ellacombe, Henry Thomas History of the Parish of Bitton, 1881.

References

External links

 Parish Council website
 Parish Church of St Mary's, Bitton
 Website of Bitton Road Runners
Local History Group (Bitton Parish History Group)

Villages in South Gloucestershire District
Civil parishes in Gloucestershire